WDFM (98.1 MHz) is an FM radio station located in Defiance, Ohio. The station is owned and operated by iHeartMedia, Inc., which purchased it from Lankenau-Small Media in 1999. It has a broadcast tower in Sherwood, Ohio.

WDFM formerly operated an on-channel booster station in Fort Wayne, Indiana, but did not rebuild it after a winter storm toppled the booster station's tower. The main WDFM signal reaches much of Fort Wayne, but the station does not target that region.  During certain conditions, the station can be received in the metro Detroit area.

Programming
Currently, it broadcasts an adult contemporary radio format as Mix 98.1, Today's Variety.  The station also plays all 1980s music on weekends.  The station switched from iHeartMedia, Inc.'s Hot AC format to mainstream AC in September 2014, following sister station WNDH's format change to Classic Hits.

Prior to its rebranding in 1999, WDFM was of the AC Hot 30 format, and prior to that and back to its sign-on in 1985, the station played easy listening music.

Television

WDFM also operated a low power television station, WDFM-LP (now WNHO-LD) channel 26. When owned by Lankenau-Small Media, they experimented with some syndicated programming, with a community bulletin board airing when no programming is scheduled. It was the last television station owned by iHeartMedia and was considered a side business of WDFM radio. WDFM-LP was donated to American Christian Television Services in 2018.

External links

Michiguide: WDFM-FM info

DFM
Mainstream adult contemporary radio stations in the United States
IHeartMedia radio stations
Radio stations established in 1985
1985 establishments in Ohio